Drewry is an English surname. Notable people with the surname include:

Arthur Drewry (1891–1961), English director of football and FIFA president
Christopher Drewry, British Army general
David Drewry (born 1947), English glaciologist and geophysicist
George Leslie Drewry (1894–1918), English Royal Navy officer and Victoria Cross recipient
James Sidney Drewry (1883–1952), British engineer
Patrick H. Drewry (1875–1947), American politician

English-language surnames